is a Japanese sprinter, who specialized in the 400 metres. Abiko competed for the men's 4 × 400 m relay at the 2008 Summer Olympics in Beijing, along with his teammates Kenji Narisako, Dai Tamesue, and Yoshihiro Horigome. He ran on the starting leg of the second heat, with an individual-split time of 46.70 seconds. Abiko and his team finished the relay in sixth place for a seasonal best time of 3:04.18, failing to advance into the final.

Personal bests

Records
Medley relay (100m×200m×300m×400m)
Current Japanese university record holder - 1:50.12 s (relay leg: 2nd) (Odawara, 16 October 2010)

 with Sōta Kawatsura, Akihiro Urano, and Hideyuki Hirose

Competition record

References

External links
 
 Mitsuhiro Abiko at JAAF 
 NBC 2008 Olympics profile

1988 births
Living people
Japanese male sprinters
Olympic athletes of Japan
Athletes (track and field) at the 2008 Summer Olympics
People from Yamagata Prefecture
Athletes (track and field) at the 2010 Asian Games
Asian Games competitors for Japan
Competitors at the 2009 Summer Universiade
21st-century Japanese people
People from Yamagata (city)